Sebastián Ariel Silguero (born 1 January 1992) is an Argentine professional footballer who plays as a defender for Club Atlético Fénix.

Career
Silguero played in the youth system of River Plate, notably featuring at the 2012 U-20 Copa Libertadores in Peru; which the club won. Having been an unused substitute for Primera División fixtures with Lanús and San Martín in December 2012, Silguero made his senior debut in the succeeding April during a Copa Argentina defeat to Estudiantes. In July 2013, Tigre signed Silguero. He remained for three seasons but made only one appearance - vs. Arsenal de Sarandí in October 2014. A move to Barracas Central was completed in 2016, prior to him joining Comunicaciones. His first senior goal came in July 2017 versus Estudiantes.

Career statistics
.

Honours
River Plate
U-20 Copa Libertadores: 2012

References

External links

1992 births
Living people
People from Formosa, Argentina
Argentine footballers
Association football defenders
Argentine Primera División players
Primera B Metropolitana players
Club Atlético River Plate footballers
Club Atlético Tigre footballers
Barracas Central players
Club Comunicaciones footballers
Club Atlético Fénix players